Fred Green may refer to:

Fred Green (Australian politician) (1900–1983), member of the New South Wales Legislative Assembly
Fred Green (baseball) (1933–1996), Major League Baseball pitcher
Fred Green (footballer) (1921–1983), Australian rules footballer and coach
Fred Pratt Green (1903–2000), British Methodist minister and hymn composer
Fred W. Green (1871–1936), American politician, governor of Michigan

See also
Frederick Green (disambiguation)
Freddie Green (1911–1987), American swing jazz guitarist